Feliniopsis leucostigma is a moth of the family Noctuidae. It is found in Sikkim and Darjeeling and has recently been recorded from China.

External links
Three species of the family Noctuidae (Lepidoptera) new to China

Hadeninae